Delloreese Patricia Early (July 6, 1931 – November 19, 2017), known professionally as Della Reese, was an American jazz and gospel singer, actress, and ordained minister whose career spanned seven decades. She began her long career as a singer, scoring a hit with her 1959 single "Don't You Know?". In the late 1960s she hosted her own talk show, Della, which ran for 197 episodes. From 1975 she also starred in films, playing opposite Redd Foxx in Harlem Nights (1989), Martin Lawrence in A Thin Line Between Love and Hate (1996) and Elliott Gould in Expecting Mary (2010). Reese achieved continued success in the religious television drama Touched by an Angel (1994–2003), in which she played the leading role of Tess.

Early years
Della Reese was born Delloreese Patricia Early on July 6, 1931, in the historic Black Bottom neighborhood of Detroit, Michigan, to Richard Thaddeus Early, an African-American steelworker, and Nellie (Mitchelle), a cook with alleged Cherokee ancestry. Her mother had had several children before Reese's birth, none of whom lived with her; hence, Reese grew up as an only child. At six years old, Reese began singing in church; from this experience she became an avid gospel singer. On weekends in the 1940s, she and her mother would go to the movies independently to watch the likes of Joan Crawford, Bette Davis, and Lena Horne portray glamorous lives on screen. Afterward, Reese would act out scenes from the films. In 1944, she began her career directing the young people's choir, after she had nurtured acting plus her obvious musical talent. She was often chosen, on radio, as a regular singer. At the age of 13, she was hired to sing with Mahalia Jackson's gospel group. Reese entered Detroit's Cass Technical High School (where she attended the same year as Edna Rae Gillooly, later known as Ellen Burstyn). She also continued with her touring with Jackson. With higher grades, she became in 1947 the first in her family to graduate from high school, aged 15.

After this she formed her own gospel group, the Meditation Singers. However, due in part to her father's serious illness and the death of her mother, Reese had to interrupt her schooling at Wayne State University to help support her family. Faithful to the memory of her mother, Delloreese moved out of her father's house when she disapproved of him taking up with a new girlfriend. She then took on odd jobs, such as truck driver, dental receptionist, and elevator operator, after 1949. Performing in clubs, Early soon decided to shorten her name from "Delloreese Early" to "Della Reese".

Musical career

Reese was discovered by the gospel singer Mahalia Jackson, and her big break came when she won a contest, which gave her a week to sing at Detroit's well-known Flame Show Bar. Reese remained there for eight weeks. Although her roots were in gospel music, she now was being exposed to and influenced by such jazz artists as Ella Fitzgerald, Sarah Vaughan and Billie Holiday. In 1953, she signed a recording contract with Jubilee Records, for which she recorded six albums. Later that year, she also joined the Hawkins Orchestra. Her first recordings for Jubilee were songs such as "In the Still of the Night" (originally published in 1937), "I've Got My Love to Keep Me Warm" and "Time After Time" (1947). The songs were later included on the album And That Reminds Me (1959).

In 1957, Reese released a single called "And That Reminds Me". After years of performing, she gained chart success with this song. It became a Top Twenty pop hit and a million-seller record. That year, Reese was voted by Billboard, Cashbox and various other magazines, as "The Most Promising Singer". In 1959, Reese moved to RCA Records and released her first RCA single, called "Don't You Know?", which was adapted from Giacomo Puccini's music for La bohème, specifically the aria "Quando m'en vo'" (Musetta's Waltz). It became her biggest hit to date, reaching the number 2 spot on the pop charts and topping the R&B charts (then called the "Hot R&B Sides") that year. It sold over one million copies, and was awarded a gold disc by the RIAA. Eventually, the song came to be widely considered the signature song of her early career. She then released a successful follow-up single called "Not One Minute More" (number 16). She remained on the Billboard Hot 100 chart with "And Now" (number 69). In 1960 she released "Someday (You'll Want Me to Want You)" (number 56), which was drawn from her Grammy-nominated album Della – a big band outing arranged by Neal Hefti who incorporated some arrangement ideas conceived by Reese.

In November 1960, Reese appeared in advertisements in Ebony magazine for the newly launched AMI Continental jukebox. Reese recorded regularly throughout the 1960s, releasing singles and several albums. Two of the most significant were The Classic Della (1962) and Waltz with Me, Della (1963), which broadened her fan base internationally. She recorded several jazz-focused albums, including Della Reese Live (1966), On Strings of Blue (1967) and One of a Kind (1978). Live hit number 21 on the R&B charts. She also performed in Las Vegas for nine years, and toured across the country. She signed with Avco Embassy Records and released the soul-pop album Black is Beautiful in 1970, charting at number 44 on the R&B chart.

In 1986, Reese formed the gospel group Brilliance with fellow singers O.C. Smith, Mary Clayton, Vermettya Royster, and Eric Strom. They released an album that  earned Reese a Grammy nomination in the gospel category for the song "You Gave Me Love" (1987). She later earned another nomination for the album Live! My Soul Feels Better Right Now (1998).

Motown singer Martha Reeves cites Reese as a major influence, and says she named her group the Vandellas after Van Dyke Street in Detroit and Della Reese. In 2017, Reese was inducted into the Rhythm & Blues Music Hall of Fame.

Television and film career

In 1969, Reese began a transition into acting work, which would eventually lead to her highest profile. Her first attempt at television stardom was a talk show series, Della, which was cancelled after 197 episodes (June 9, 1969 – March 13, 1970). In 1970, Reese became the first black woman to guest host The Tonight Show Starring Johnny Carson. She appeared in several TV movies and miniseries, was a regular on Chico and the Man and played the mother of B. A. Baracus in The A-Team episode "Lease with an Option to Die". In 1991, she starred opposite her old friend Redd Foxx in his final sitcom, The Royal Family, but his death halted production of the series for several months. Reese also did voice-over for the late 1980s Hanna-Barbera animated series A Pup Named Scooby-Doo on ABC. In 1989, she starred alongside Eddie Murphy, Richard Pryor and Redd Foxx in the film Harlem Nights, in which she performed a fight scene with Eddie Murphy. Reese appeared as a panelist on several episodes of the television game show Match Game.

Television guest appearances 
Reese had a wide variety of guest-starring roles, beginning with an episode of The Mod Squad. This led to other roles in such series as: The Bold Ones: The New Doctors, Getting Together, Police Woman, Petrocelli, Joe Forrester, Police Story, The Rookies, McCloud, Sanford and Son (with Redd Foxx), Vega$, and Insight. She featured in two episodes of The Love Boat, three episodes of Crazy Like a Fox, four episodes of Charlie & Co. (opposite Flip Wilson), 227 (with best friend Marla Gibbs), MacGyver, Night Court, Dream On, Designing Women, Picket Fences, Disney Channel's That's So Raven, and The Young and the Restless. She also had a recurring role in It Takes Two opposite Richard Crenna and Patty Duke.

Touched by an Angel 
After coping with the death of one of her best friends, Redd Foxx, in 1991, she was reluctant to play the older female lead in inspirational television drama Touched by an Angel, but went ahead and auditioned for the role of Tess. She wanted to have a one-shot agreement between CBS and producer Martha Williamson, but the network ordered more episodes. Reese was widely seen as a key component of the show's success. Already starring on Touched by an Angel was the lesser-known Irish actress Roma Downey, who played the role of case worker Tess's angel/employee, Monica. In numerous interviews, there was an on- and off-screen chemistry between both Reese and Downey. The character of Tess was the angelic supervisor who sent the other angels out on missions to help people redeem their lives and show them God's love, while at the same time, she was sassy and had a no-nonsense attitude. The show often featured a climactic monologue delivered by the angel Monica in which she reveals herself as an angel to a human with the words: "I am an angel sent by God to tell you that He loves you." The character of Tess was portrayed by Reese as down-to-earth, experienced and direct. Reese also sang the show's theme song, "Walk with You", and was featured prominently on the soundtrack album produced in conjunction with the show.

During its first season in 1994, many critics were skeptical about the show, it being the second overtly religious prime-time fantasy series, after Highway to Heaven. The show had a rocky start, low ratings and was cancelled 11 episodes into the first season. However, with the help of a massive letter-writing campaign, the show was resuscitated the following season and became a huge ratings winner for the next seven seasons. At the beginning of the fourth season in 1997, Reese threatened to leave the show because she was making less than her co-stars; CBS ended up raising her salary. In 2000, her health problems became obvious when she collapsed on the set and was hospitalized. Touched by an Angel was cancelled in 2003, but it continued re-running heavily in syndication and on Ion Television (formerly PAX-TV), The Hallmark Channel, Up, and later MeTV. Downey said of her on- and off-screen relationship with Reese:

Downey also said:

Personal life
Reese was the godmother of Roma Downey's daughter Reilly Marie. Reese officiated at the marriage ceremony of Downey and Mark Burnett in the absence of Downey's late mother.

Family
Reese's mother, Nellie Mitchelle Early, died in 1949 of an intracerebral hemorrhage. Reese's father, Richard Early, died ten years later. Reese had an adoptive daughter from a family member unable to care for her, named Delorese Daniels Owens, born in 1961. Owens died on March 14, 2002. She died from complications stemming from pituitary disease. Sharing her frustration with the lack of awareness and knowledge of pituitary disorders, Reese said:

Marriages
In 1952, Reese married factory worker Vermont Adolphus Bon Taliaferro, nineteen years her senior. She adopted the stage name Pat Ferro for a week, before introducing the stage name she used for the rest of her life—though sources differ as to whether this name change was after the failure of the marriage, or simply a show-business decision. A second marriage ceremony, on December 28, 1959, to accountant Leroy Basil Gray, who had two children by a previous marriage, was kept secret for some time. This marriage either ended in divorce or was annulled on the basis that Gray's previous divorce was invalid. In 1961, Reese was briefly married to bandleader Mercer Ellington (who was then her manager), before their union was annulled later that year due to Ellington's Mexican divorce from his wife Evelyn Walker being ruled invalid. In 1983, Reese married Franklin Thomas Lett, Jr., a concert producer and writer.

Ministry
In the 1980s, Reese was ordained a minister through the Christian New Thought branch known as Unity after serving as the senior minister and founder of her own church, Understanding Principles for Better Living. The "Up Church" is under Universal Foundation for Better Living, a denomination of Christian New Thought founded by Rev. Johnnie Colemon, a close friend of Rev. Reese-Lett. In her ministerial work, she was known as the Rev. Dr. Della Reese Lett.

Health and death
In 1979, during taping for a guest spot on The Tonight Show, Reese suffered a near-fatal brain aneurysm, but made a full recovery after two surgeries by neurosurgeon Charles Drake at University Hospital in London, Ontario. In 2016, shortly after her 85th birthday, Reese was said to be in poor health, and had undergone multiple surgeries. She stated that she had neglected her health for years, which had contributed to her developing type 2 diabetes. After her last appearance in Signed, Sealed, Delivered, she retired from acting. While Reese sometimes used a wheelchair, she avoided using one often, out of concern it would make her condition worse.

Reese died at her home in the Encino neighborhood of Los Angeles on November 19, 2017, at the age of 86.

Discography

Filmography

Film

Television films

Television series

Awards and nominations
Awards
 1994: Hollywood Walk of Fame: 7060 Hollywood Boulevard—Television
 1996: Image Award for Outstanding Lead Actress in a Drama Series—Touched by an Angel
 1997: Image Award for Outstanding Lead Actress in a Drama Series—Touched by an Angel
 1998: Image Award for Outstanding Lead Actress in a Drama Series—Touched by an Angel
 1999: Image Award for Outstanding Lead Actress in a Drama Series—Touched by an Angel
 2000: Image Award for Outstanding Lead Actress in a Drama Series—Touched by an Angel
 2001: Image Award for Outstanding Lead Actress in a Drama Series—Touched by an Angel
 2002: Image Award for Outstanding Lead Actress in a Drama Series—Touched by an Angel
 2015: Golden Palm Star on the Palm Springs Walk of Stars
 2017: Rhythm & Blues Music Hall of Fame Award

Nominations
 1961: Grammy Award—Della (Album)
 1987: Grammy Award—"You Gave Me Love"
 1997: Primetime Emmy Award for Outstanding Supporting Actress in a Drama Series—Touched by an Angel
 1997: Screen Actors Guild Award for Outstanding Performance by a Female Actor in a Drama Series—Touched by an Angel
 1997: Golden Globe Award for Best Performance by an Actress in a Supporting Role in a Made for TV Series—Touched by an Angel
 1998: Emmy Award for Outstanding Supporting Actress in a Drama Series—Touched by an Angel
 1998: Screen Actors Guild Award for Outstanding Performance by a Female Actor in a Drama Series—Touched by an Angel
 1998: Grammy Award—Live! My Soul Feels Better Right Now
 2000: Annie Award for Outstanding Individual Achievement for Voice Acting By a Female Performer in an Animated Feature—Dinosaur

References

External links

 
 
 
 Della Reese Interview at The Archive of American Television
 Understanding Principles for Better Living Church
 Della Reese's Tough TV Career
 Della Reese's oral history video excerpts at The National Visionary Leadership Project
 

1931 births
2017 deaths
20th-century African-American women singers
20th-century American singers
20th-century American women singers
20th-century Christians
21st-century African-American women
21st-century American non-fiction writers
21st-century American singers
21st-century American women singers
21st-century American women writers
21st-century Christians
Actresses from Detroit
African-American Christians
African-American actresses
African-American television talk show hosts
African-American women writers
African-American writers
American Christian writers
American evangelists
American film actresses
American gospel singers
American jazz singers
American people of Cherokee descent
American people who self-identify as being of Native American descent
American performers of Christian music
American stage actresses
American television actresses
American television talk show hosts
American voice actresses
American women jazz singers
American women non-fiction writers
Avco Records artists
Cass Technical High School alumni
Jazz musicians from Michigan
Jubilee Records artists
New Thought writers
Nondenominational Christianity
RCA Victor artists
Singers from Detroit
Traditional pop music singers
Wayne State University alumni
Women evangelists
Writers from Michigan